The 1999–2000 Busta Cup was the 34th edition of what is now the Regional Four Day Competition, the domestic first-class cricket competition for the countries of the West Indies Cricket Board (WICB). It was played from 6 January to 25 February 2000.

Six teams contested the competition – Barbados, Guyana, Jamaica, the Leeward Islands, Trinidad and Tobago, and the Windward Islands. Barbados topped the table after the round-robin, but lost to the Leeward Islands in their semi-final. However, the Leeward Islands lost to Jamaica in the final, who won their fifth domestic first-class title. Jamaica's Chris Gayle was the leading run-scorer and was named player of the tournament, while Curtly Ambrose of the Leeward Islands and Guyana's Mahendra Nagamootoo were the equal leading wicket-takers.

Points table

Key

 W – Outright win (12 points)
 L – Outright loss (0 points)
 LWF – Lost match, but won first innings (4 points)

 DWF – Drawn, but won first innings (6 points)
 DLF – Drawn, but lost first innings (3 points)
 Pts – Total points

Statistics

Most runs
The top five run-scorers are included in this table, listed by runs scored and then by batting average.

Most wickets

The top five wicket-takers are listed in this table, listed by wickets taken and then by bowling average.

See also
 1999–2000 Red Stripe Bowl
 Cricket Player MVP

References

West Indian cricket seasons from 1970–71 to 1999–2000
2000 in West Indian cricket
Regional Four Day Competition seasons
Domestic cricket competitions in 1999–2000